Josie Parrelli was the host of RMITV show Chartbusting 80s, a long-running music-variety show that aired on Channel 31 Melbourne.

Josie Parrelli was first involved in the music industry as a volunteer at radio station PBS 106.7FM in October 1999, then was asked to be co-host on the 1980s, 1990s Electronica show "Irvine Jump" for six months, during that time Josie was offered the opportunity of hosting her own insomnia show which started in September 2000 called "Delirious" playing hits of the 1980s and 1990s and also featuring interviews with 1980s artists.

In May 2000 Josie came up with the concept of Chartbusting 80s, the program debuting on Melbourne screens Wednesday 1 November 2000 at 7pm.

Josie Parrelli is the head of production company "Lady Scorpio Productions", and produced the series of Chartbusting 80s DVDs. Josie has also worked behind the scenes as a director, production manager, producer, unit manager for OB (The Falls) music festival for RMIT University's RMITV, programming manager for RMITV.

Acting credits include being an extra on various Australian television shows such as Neighbours, Blue Heelers, Stingers and MDA and lead actress in upcoming Australian feature film "Up for Grabs". Josie's CV also includes being a radio announcer, media and hairdressing teacher, motivational speaker and the equity extras liaison/branch councillor with the Media, Entertainment and Arts Alliance in Melbourne.

Josie was given the 'Best Contribution to Community Television' Award at the 2008 Antenna Awards for her work on CB80's.

See also
Chartbusting 80s

References

External links 
 Chartbusting 80s

Australian television presenters
Australian women television presenters
Australian hairdressers
Living people
Year of birth missing (living people)
RMITV alumni